The Lauteraar Hut (German: Lauteraarhütte) is a mountain hut of the Swiss Alpine Club, located south-west of Handegg in the canton of Bern.

The shortest access to the hut is from the Grimsel Hospice, below the Grimsel Pass.

References
Swisstopo topographic maps

External links 
Official website

Mountain huts in Switzerland
Buildings and structures in the canton of Bern
Mountain huts in the Alps